Eli Hudnall Cook (born April 24, 1986) is an American singer, songwriter, guitarist and record producer. He is known for an eclectic style, with a focus on blues and blues rock. His deep, rich baritone voice and guitar playing have drawn widespread acclaim.

Life and career

Early years
Cook was raised in the backwoods of Faber, Virginia, near the Blue Ridge Mountains. Inspired by a lack of television and his parents' diverse record collection, he picked up the guitar at age 13, imitating the styles of Mississippi John Hurt and Fred McDowell.

Two years later, he began performing acoustic blues at Rapunzel's Coffee House in Lovingston. As a student at Monticello High School, his first power trio, 'The Red House Blues Band' (an apparent nod to Jimi Hendrix's Are You Experienced? track), was formed with rotating membership. By age 18, Cook was playing church revivals solo, and touring the bar scene with his band throughout central Virginia. Because of this, he built a reputation as a prodigy of both electric and acoustic performance, and was often featured in local publications.

Recent years
Cook plays gigs mostly around Virginia, and resides in Charlottesville.

Noteworthy Appearances
Cook’s first break happened in 2007 when he was asked to open for B.B. King at multiple shows. Since then, he has shared the stage with Johnny Winter, Robert Cray, Robin Trower, Parliament-Funkadelic, Shemekia Copeland, Gary Clark, Jr., and Roomful of Blues. He has performed on the Millennium Stage at the John F. Kennedy Center for the Performing Arts and at the South by Southwest Festival in 2014. Cook has also opened for John Mayall at The Hamilton in Washington, D.C.

Releases
Three of Cook's first four albums, Moonshine Mojo, Electricholyfirewater, and Static in the Blood, were independent releases that each displayed unique moods: guitar focused country rock, blues metal, and experimental R&B, respectively.

Valley Entertainment internationally reissued his 2005 recording, Miss Blues' Child, in 2007. It included Cook's versions of Jimmy Reed's "Baby What You Want Me to Do" and Bukka White's "Fixin' To Die."

2011 saw the release of Ace, Jack & King, which showcased a mix of the various genres for which he is known.

In 2013, Cook signed a recording contract with Cleopatra Records. The ensuing album, Primitive Son (2014), contained guest appearances by Vinny Appice and Artimus Pyle (drums); Tinsley Ellis, Eric Gales, Leslie West, Pat Travers and Harvey Mandel (guitar); Sonny Landreth (slide guitar); Rod Piazza (harmonica); and Reese Wynans (Hammond B3 organ). The album was co-produced by Greg Hampton.

In August 2017, he released High-Dollar Gospel on the C.R. 8 Records label to a positive reception.

Equipment
Cook performs solo on a resophonic guitar by National and a 12-string acoustic guitar made by Rockbridge Guitars in Charlottesville, Virginia. Both instruments are electrified supplementally. With the band, he plays a customized Fender Stratocaster and Telecaster.

Acclaim

Blues Matters! magazine featured Cook on the cover of its October/November (No. 86) issue. He was listed in its 2015 Writer’s Poll as the third most "Favorite International Blues Solo Artist."

Most of his albums have been reviewed favorably in the press, including positive reviews in Vintage Guitar magazine.

Leslie West said of recording with him, “I have heard quite a few guitar players that are young and just starting out. When I was asked to play a track with Eli Cook I wanted to see if there was something there. Believe me when I tell you THERE IS SOMETHING THERE! I hope you enjoy listening to it as much as I did playing on it. Eli is on his way!”

Tinsley Ellis called him a “triple threat, obviously a great guitarist but also an emotive singer and an innovative songwriter. He’s in the vanguard of young, 21st-century blues rockers!”

AllMusic stated in their review of Miss Blues' Child, "he has what it takes to be the best blues singer of his generation."

Discography

Studio albums
 Moonshine Mojo (2004)
 Electricholyfirewater (2007)
 Miss Blues' Child (2007)
 Static In The Blood (2009)
 Ace, Jack & King (2011)
 Primitive Son (2014)
 High-Dollar Gospel (2017)

EPs
 All Night Thing (2020)

Singles
 "Baby Please Don't Go" (2014)

See also

List of electric blues musicians

References

External links
Official website
"All Night Thing" music video
"Miss Treatinest" lyric video
"Born Under A Bad Sign" live
"Catfish Blues" live
"Baby Please Don't Go" music video

1986 births
Living people
21st-century American male singers
21st-century American singers
American rock singers
American blues singer-songwriters
American blues guitarists
American male guitarists
Record producers from Virginia
Singer-songwriters from Virginia
People from Nelson County, Virginia
21st-century American guitarists
Guitarists from Virginia
American male singer-songwriters